i24NEWS is an English language international news television channel owned by Altice USA. It is the English version of i24NEWS. The network began broadcasting in the US on February 13, 2017. It is live from 6 to 10p.m. Eastern Time and at other times broadcasts from Israel.

History

Original English channel
The original channel went live on 17 July 2013. Franck Melloul, the CEO, stated that it would battle prejudice and ignorance about Israel with “facts and diversity.”

Arab Israeli journalist Lucy Aharish was the lead anchor of the original English-language branch of the channel from July 2013 until she resigned in January 2016. Her show, The News Today, was replaced by News Now with Merav Savir. News Now was cancelled after only a few months of broadcasting, ahead of changes to the network.

On 8 December 2016, all programming on the English channel officially ended in preparation for launching in America. The channel broadcast 10 minutes of news on the hour, from 8am to 11pm (local time), and replaced Morning Edition, The Daily Beat, and The Lineup with a 26-minute news bulletin, repeated at half past each hour.

Current English channel
The launch of i24NEWS in the United States was announced on January 27, 2017. The channel is operated out of its headquarters in Jaffa.

Live programming is broadcast from Times Square in New York City, with an additional bureau in Washington, DC. Approximately 50 journalists were hired to staff the two locations. The channel uses resources from its Jaffa headquarters.

Initial distribution is limited to Altice USA-owned Optimum and Suddenlink cable systems. In November 2017, Spectrum began to roll out the channel nationwide. December 2019, it was added to AT&T U-Verse on channels 223 and 1223.

Among the first journalists hired were Michelle Makori, who is also the Editor-in-Chief, David Shuster, who is also the managing editor, and Dan Raviv, a veteran of over 40 years with CBS News. The channel acquired many of its initial behind-the-scenes personnel from the former Al Jazeera America channel.

News Team
 Michelle Makori – Host of ClearCut and Crossroads
 Michael Shure – National correspondent and fill in host
 David Shuster – Host of Stateside and Crossroads

Programming
 i24NEWS DESK, previously called The News, a 10-minute news bulletin (occasionally 26 minutes) at the top of the hour and half past
 Daily Dose
 Perspectives 
 The Rundown
 Debrief
 Crossroads
 ClearCut
 Stateside

References

External links

24-hour television news channels in the United States
English-language television stations in the United States
Television channels and stations established in 2017
Altice USA